Bashkand, Bashkend, Başkənd or Bash Kand may refer to:

 Artsvashen, je jure exclave of Armenia, occupied by Azerbaijan which calls it Bashkand/Başkənd
 Bashkand, Bostanabad, East Azerbaijan Province
 Bash Kand, Sarab, East Azerbaijan Province
 Bashkand, West Azerbaijan
 Başkənd, Kalbajar, Azerbaijan
 Başkənd, Khojali, Azerbaijan
 Başkənd, Nakhchivan, Azerbaijan
 Gegharkunik, Gegharkunik, Armenia, formerly Bashkend
 Vernashen, Armenia, formerly Bashkend

See also
Başköy (disambiguation)